James Blyth, Baron Blyth (10 September 1841 – 8 September 1925), known as "Sir James Blyth, 1st Baronet" from 1895 to 1907, was a British businessman and liberal party supporter.

Blyth was the son of James Blyth and his wife Caroline, daughter of Henry Gilbey. He notably served as a Director of the wine mercantile firm of W. and A. Gilbey and was a recognised authority on wine culture and wine commerce. He was also deeply interested in agriculture and farming. Apart from his business career Blyth was a Justice of the Peace for Hertfordshire and Essex and served as vice-president of the Royal Society of Arts. He was created a Baronet, of Blythwood in the Parish of Stansted Mountfitchet in the County of Essex, on 30 August 1895, and on 19 July 1907 he was raised to the peerage as Baron Blyth, of Blythwood in the Parish Stansted Mountfichet in the County of Essex. He was also appointed Grand Cross of Civil Order of the Merito Agricola Portuguese Ordem do Mérito Empresarial, Order of the Medjidie and Order of Leopold (Belgium).

Lord Blyth married Eliza, daughter of William Mooney, in 1865. They had three sons and four 
daughters.

His son Audley died in mysterious circumstances while in East Africa with John Patterson.

Eliza died in 1894. Lord Blyth survived her by over 30 years and died in September 1925, aged 83. He was succeeded in his titles by his eldest son Herbert.

Notes

References
Kidd, Charles, Williamson, David (editors). Debrett's Peerage and Baronetage (1990 edition). New York: St Martin's Press, 1990.

1841 births
1925 deaths
Barons in the Peerage of the United Kingdom
Peers created by Edward VII